Ömer the Tourist is a 1964 Turkish comedy film directed by Hulki Saner.

Plot

Cast 
 Sadri Alışık - Turist Ömer
 Vahi Öz - Ruknettin Yakar
 Mualla Sürer - Bedia Yanar
 Çolpan İlhan

References

External links 

1964 comedy films
1964 films
Turkish comedy films
Turkish black-and-white films